is a Japanese josei manga artist, known for specializing in yaoi manga. She debuted as a professional manga artist in 1996 and since then has published several yaoi series and illustrated many light novels. Ayano Yamane is known for her humour and detailed art. She is one of the top selling yaoi manga artists in Japan. Her most successful work is the Finder Series. Although her great success in the Boys' Love realm, she has been accused for depicting sexual abuse as something romantic and beautiful, plus sexualizing male bodies.

Works 
  (Biblos → Libre Publishing, 2002-)
 , Core Magazine, 2003.
 , Biblos, 2004
 , Tokuma Shoten, 2005.

In 2010, Digital Manga Publishing licensed Finder Series in English. From 2007 to 2008, Kitty Media held the North American license of Crimson Spell, but in 2013 SuBLime Manga acquired the rights to publish this title. 801 Media has licensed A Foreign Love Affair''.

References

External links 
 All About Yamane Ayano (Official website)
 

Living people
Women manga artists
Japanese female comics artists
Manga artists from Hyōgo Prefecture
Japanese illustrators
Japanese women illustrators
1977 births